Paul Young is a Ni-Vanuatu footballer who plays as a defender.

References 

Living people
1988 births
Vanuatuan footballers
Vanuatu international footballers
Association football defenders
2012 OFC Nations Cup players